RKKY stands for Ruderman–Kittel–Kasuya–Yosida. It refers to a coupling mechanism of nuclear magnetic moments or localized inner d- or f-shell electron spins in a metal by means of an interaction through the conduction electrons. 

The RKKY interaction was originally proposed by Malvin Ruderman and Charles Kittel of the University of California, Berkeley, as a means of explaining unusually broad nuclear spin resonance lines that had been observed in natural metallic silver. The theory uses second-order perturbation theory to describe an indirect exchange coupling whereby the nuclear spin of one atom interacts with a conduction electron through the hyperfine interaction, and this conduction electron then interacts with another nuclear spin, thus creating a correlation energy between the two nuclear spins. (Alternatively, instead of nuclear spins coupling to conduction spins through the hyperfine interaction, another scenario is for inner electron spins to couple to conduction spins through the exchange interaction.) The theory is based on Bloch wavefunctions and is therefore only applicable to crystalline systems. The derived exchange interaction takes the following form:

Tadao Kasuya from Nagoya University later proposed that a similar indirect exchange coupling could be applied to localized inner d-electron spins interacting through conduction electrons. This theory was expanded more completely by Kei Yosida of the UC Berkeley, to give a Hamiltonian that describes (d-electron spin)–(d-electron spin), (nuclear spin)–(nuclear spin), and (d-electron spin)–(nuclear spin) interactions. J.H. Van Vleck clarified some subtleties of the theory, particularly the relationship between the first- and second-order perturbative contributions.

Perhaps the most significant application of the RKKY theory has been to the theory of giant magnetoresistance (GMR). GMR was discovered when the coupling between thin layers of magnetic materials separated by a non-magnetic spacer material was found to oscillate between ferromagnetic and antiferromagnetic as a function of the distance between the layers. This ferromagnetic/antiferromagnetic oscillation is one prediction of the RKKY theory.

References

Further reading
 

Magnetic exchange interactions

es:Interacción RKKY